The 45th Judan was held from May 11, 2006 to April 25, 2007. The current sponsor is Sankei Newspapers. The holder is Cho Chikun, and the challenger is Keigo Yamashita for the second time in-a-row. Hideki Komatsu, Norimoto Yoda, Kimio Yamada, Hideo Otake, Koichi Kobayashi, Kim Shushun, Naoki Hane, and Takeshi Sakai qualified through preliminary tournaments. The rest of the players were given spots automatically.

Preliminaries

Main tournament

Winners section

Losers section

Challenger finals

Finals

References

External links
Judan information from Nihon Ki-in
Igo-Kisen Judan

2007 in go
2007 in Japan
Go competitions in Japan
2006 in go
2006 in Japan